Cooked may refer to:

 Cooked: A Natural History of Transformation, a book by Michael Pollan
 Cooked, a 2005 TV pilot starring comedian Dane Cook

See also
 Cook (disambiguation)